Rauli Levonen (15 July 1953 – 1 December 1981) was a Finnish ice hockey player. He represented Pori Aus in 1972–1981 during the main series. He won the Finnish Championship in 1978 in Ace, the SM silver in 1979 and 1980 and the SM bronze in 1976. He died at the age of 28 of a heart attack. He felt chest pains during a match against HC Ganal Rauma and was rushed to the hospital where he died.

References

1953 births
1981 deaths
Finnish ice hockey players
Place of birth missing
Ässät players
Ice hockey players who died while playing
Sport deaths in Finland